Euchloe aegyptiaca is a butterfly in the family Pieridae. It is found from Libya to Egypt and Jordan, extending into Saudi Arabia.

The larvae feed on Brassicaceae species, including Diplotaxis harra.

References

Euchloe
Butterflies described in 1911
Taxa named by Ruggero Verity